Leif Aronsson (27 January 1938 – 17 January 1987) was a Swedish footballer. He made one appearance for Sweden, 134 Allsvenskan appearances for Degerfors IF and one Allsvenskan appearance for Djurgårdens IF. He was the brother of fellow footballer Jan Aronsson.

References 

1938 births
1987 deaths
Swedish footballers
Sweden international footballers
Allsvenskan players
Degerfors IF players
Djurgårdens IF Fotboll players
Association football wingers
People from Karlskoga Municipality
Sportspeople from Örebro County
20th-century Swedish people